What is truth may refer to:

John 18:38, a verse from the Bible, also known as "What is truth?"
Edi Nijam, a 1965 Telugu film whose English title is What is Truth
"What Is Truth", a 1970 single by Johnny Cash
What is Truth?, a 1976 book by philosopher C. J. F. Williams

See also
Truth
Religious views on truth